Fengdu County (formerly ) is a county located in Chongqing Municipality, People's Republic of China. The county was established as Fengdu County during the Sui Dynasty. The name was changed to Fengdu County during the Ming Dynasty. In 1958, the name was changed back to Fengdu County.

Administration
Before changes in 2013, Fengdu County had 2 subdistricts,  21 towns and 7 townships. , Fengdu County had 2 subdistricts, 23 towns and 5 townships. As of 2020, Fengdu County has the following 2 subdistricts, 23 towns, and 5 townships:

Climate

Ghost City

The Fengdu Ghost City is a tourist attraction modelled after Diyu, the concept of hell in Chinese mythology and Buddhism. It was built over 1,800 years ago. The ghost city became an island once the Three Gorges Dam project was completed. Specifically, part of the Fengdu Ghost City is or will be submerged, but scenery above the "Door of Hell" remains or will remain above water.

Transportation
Fengdu has one Yangtze crossing, the Fengdu Yangtze River Bridge.

Image gallery

References

External links
Pictures of Fengdu Ghost Town
Godchecker entry on Feng Du
Pictures of Feng Du Necropolis (Chinese)
Fengdu - The Ghost City information
Victoria Cruises press release details changes to Fengdu ghost town
China's ghost town vanishes
Fengdu

 
County-level divisions of Chongqing